Vetkoek is a traditional South African  fried dough bread. The vetkoek forms a part of South African culture. It is similar to the Caribbean Johnny cake, the Dutch oliebol, and the Mexican sopaipillas. It is also known by the Xhosa and Zulu name igwinya (plural amagwinya).

The word vetkoek literally means "fat cake" in Afrikaans. It is similar in shape to a doughnut without a hole, and is made with a yeast dough. Vetkoeks are also often made alongside a curry mince, which is stuffed inside. Vetkoek is commonly sold at family-owned takeaway restaurants and African festivals and cultural events.

Vetkoek is a popular meal for many people living in South Africa where it is served plain or with a filling and is hot and is sold by a wide variety of small trading businesses, hawkers at taxi ranks, roadside vendors, and fast food shops located throughout South Africa, Namibia and Botswana.

See also
 List of African dishes
 South African cuisine

References

External links
A typical recipe

South African pastries
Deep fried foods